Stenmark is a Swedish surname. Notable people with the surname include:

 Ingemar Stenmark (born 1956), Swedish skier
 Mikael Stenmark (born 1962), Swedish philosopher
 Rigmor Stenmark (born 1940), Swedish politician

See also
 11004 Stenmark, outer main-belt asteroid

Swedish-language surnames